Lopy is a surname. Notable people with the surname include:

 Dion Lopy (born 2002), Senegalese football player
 Joseph Lopy (born 1992), Senegalese football player

See also
 , Alaska